Drassyllus lepidus is a spider in the family Gnaphosidae ("ground spiders"), in the infraorder Araneomorphae ("true spiders").
The distribution range of Drassyllus lepidus includes the US and Mexico.

References

Gnaphosidae
Spiders described in 1899